Joëlle Sandrine Mbumi Nkouindjin (born 25 May 1986) is a Cameroonian athlete whose specialty is the triple jump. She competed at the 2015 World Championships in Beijing without qualifying for the final. She has personal bests of 14.16 metres in the triple jump (Yaoundé 2015) and 6.35 metres in the long jump (Yaoundé 2014).

Competition record

References

1986 births
Living people
Cameroonian female triple jumpers
Cameroonian female long jumpers
World Athletics Championships athletes for Cameroon
Commonwealth Games competitors for Cameroon
Athletes (track and field) at the 2014 Commonwealth Games
Athletes (track and field) at the 2018 Commonwealth Games
Athletes (track and field) at the 2015 African Games
Sportspeople from Yaoundé
Athletes (track and field) at the 2016 Summer Olympics
Olympic athletes of Cameroon
African Games gold medalists for Cameroon
African Games medalists in athletics (track and field)
Athletes (track and field) at the 2019 African Games
Islamic Solidarity Games competitors for Cameroon
21st-century Cameroonian women